Accidental Luxuriance of the Translucent Watery Rebus is an animated film by Croatian director Dalibor Barić, shortlisted for the 2021 Satellite Awards in the Motion Picture, Animated or Mixed Media category and submitted to the 2021 Academy Award for Best Animated Feature.

Production and release
The techniques used in the film include rotoscoping, collage and found footage. Barić took care of many parts of the films's creation himself; including direction, scripting, animation, compositing, soundtrack and editing. The film had a budget of €20,000.

The film was initially shown in ten Croatian arthouse cinemas and shown in the Zagreb Museum of Contemporary Art in 2020. In order to qualify for the Academy Awards it was also shown at Laemmle in early 2021. The film's general release was as Video on Demand on Vimeo.

Reception
In the Los Angeles Times, Carlos Agulilar  described the film as "A surrealist noir film resembling the retro futurism of Alphaville" and in Variety, reviewer Michael Nordine described the film as "vibrant and alive in a way that few films falling under the wide umbrella of animation even attempt to be." Peter Bradshaw, in a four star review for The Guardian, referred to it as a "distinctly disturbing and even absorbing" reverie, stating that there is "something impressive in the film’s indifference to narrative meaning or ordinary legibility." On Rotten Tomatoes the film holds an score of  based on  reviews.

References

External links
 
 Trailer for Accidental Luxuriance of the Translucent Watery Rebus
 Stream Accidental Luxuriance of the Translucent Watery Rebus
2020 films
2020s Croatian-language films
Croatian animated films
2020 animated films